The Mid District Cup, presently called the Worthington Mid District Cup for sponsorship reasons, is an annual rugby union competition that is contested between clubs in South Wales. The competition is a knock-out format and teams from the Welsh Premier Division are not eligible to participate. Organised by the Mid District Rugby Union, the competition is available to any team that is affiliated to the body.

Mid District Cup finals

Notes

Rugby union competitions in Wales
Wales
2004 establishments in Wales